The following is a list of television series produced in Germany:

Current

Drama
 4 Blocks (TNT Serie, 2017–2019)
 Alarm für Cobra 11 – Die Autobahnpolizei (RTL, 1996–present)
 Babylon Berlin (Sky 1 & ARD, 2017–present)
 Bad Banks (ZDF & arte, 2018–present)
 Beat (Amazon Prime Video, 2018–present)
 Bettys Diagnose (ZDF, 2015–present)
 Das Boot (TV series) (Sky 1, 2018–present)
 Der Bulle und das Biest (Sat.1, 2019–present)
 Charité (ARD, 2017–present)
 Dark (Netflix, 2017–2020)
 Deutsch-les-Landes (Magenta TV, 2018–present)
 Dogs of Berlin (Netflix, 2018–present)
 Einstein (Sat.1, 2017–present)
 In aller Freundschaft (ARD, 1998–present)
 Leipzig Homicide (ZDF, 2001–present)
 Polizeiruf 110 (Fernsehen der DDR, 1971−1990; ARD, 1990–present)
 SOKO 5113 (ZDF, 1976–2020)
 Tatort (ARD, 1970–present)
 Das Traumschiff (ZDF, 1981–present)
 Um Himmels Willen (ARD, 2002–present)
 Weissensee (ARD, 2010–present)
 Wilsberg (ZDF, 1995–present)

Comedy
 Beck is back! (RTL, 2018–2019)
 Beste Schwestern (RTL, 2018–2019)
 Crime Scene Cleaner (Der Tatortreiniger) (NDR, 2011–present)
 heute-show (ZDF, 2009–present)
 jerks. (Maxdome & ProSieben, 2017–present)
 Der Lehrer (RTL, 2009–2021)
 Magda macht das schon! (RTL, 2016–2021)
 Pastewka (Sat.1, 2005–2014; Amazon Prime Video, 2018–2020)
 Sankt Maik (RTL, 2018–2021)

Game shows
 Dalli Dalli (ZDF, 1971–1986 and 2011–2015)
 Die Perfekte Minute (Sat 1, 2010–2015)
 Rette die Million! (ZDF, 2010–2013)
 Schlag den Henssler (ProSieben, 2017–2018)
 Schlag den Raab (ProSieben, 2006–2015)
 Schlag den Star (ProSieben, 2009–present)
 Wer wird Millionär? (RTL, 1999–present)
 Wetten, dass..? (ZDF, 1981–2014)
 Am laufenden Band (ARD, 1974−1979)
 Der Große Preis (ARD, 1974−1993)
 Auf Los geht’s los (ARD, 1977−1986)

Talent shows
 Deutschland sucht den Superstar (RTL, 2002–present)
 Germany's Next Topmodel (ProSieben, 2006–present)
 Popstars (RTL 2, 2000−2001; ProSieben 2003–2015)
 Das Supertalent (RTL, 2008–present)
 The Voice of Germany (Sat 1, ProSieben 2011–present)
 X Factor (Germany) (VOX, 2010–2012)

News
 heute (ZDF, 1963–present)
 heute-journal (ZDF, 1978–present)
 heute-journal up:date (ZDF, 2020–present)
 Punkt 6 (RTL, 1997–2013)
 Punkt 9 (RTL, 2000–2013)
 Guten Morgen Deutschland (RTL, 2013–present)
 Punkt 12 (RTL, 1992–present)
 RTL aktuell (RTL, 1988–present)
 RTL Nachtjournal (RTL, 1994–present)
 RTLZWEI News (RTLZWEI, 1993 – present)
 Morgenmagazin (ARD, ZDF; 1992–present)
 Mittagsmagazin (ARD, ZDF; 1989–present)
 Newstime (ProSieben, 1989–present)
 Sat.1 Nachrichten (Sat 1, 2008–present)
 Nachtmagazin (ARD, 1995–present)
 Tagesschau (ARD, 1952–present)
 Tagesthemen (ARD, 1978–present)
 VOX Nachrichten (VOX, 1995–present)
 kabel eins news (kabel eins, 1997–present)

Soap operas
 Alles was zählt (RTL, 2006–present)
 Gute Zeiten, schlechte Zeiten (RTL, 1992–present)
 Lindenstraße (ARD, 1985–2020)
 Marienhof (TV series) (ARD, 1992–2011)
 Unter uns (RTL, 1994–present)
 Verbotene Liebe (ARD, 1995–2015)
 Sturm der Liebe (ARD, 2005−present)

Others

-
1, 2 oder 3
4 Blocks
4 gegen Z
6 Richtige
18 – Allein unter Mädchen
100 Jahre – Der Countdown
112 – Sie retten dein Leben
0137 (Talkshow)
1000 Meisterwerke
2000 Jahre Christentum (TV series)

A
Abenteuer Airport
Die Abenteuer der Bremer Stadtmusikanten
Abramakabra
Abschnitt 40
Adelheid und ihre Mörder
Der Adler – Die Spur des Verbrechens
Adrian der Tulpendieb
Die Affäre Semmeling
Agathe kann’s nicht lassen
Alarm in den Bergen
The Alaska Kid
Albert sagt... Natur – aber nur!
Alfred J. Kwak
Alisa – Folge deinem Herzen
Alle lieben Jimmy
Alle meine Tiere
Alle meine Töchter
Alle zusammen – jeder für sich
Allein gegen die Zeit
Allein unter Bauern
Alles Atze
Alles außer Mord
Alles außer Sex
Alles in Ordnung – Mit dem Wahnsinn auf Streife
Alles was zählt
Almenrausch und Pulverschnee
Die Alpenklinik
Alpha 0.7 – Der Feind in dir
Alpha Alpha
Alphateam – Die Lebensretter im OP
Der Alte
Am grünen Strand der Spree
America – The Freedom to Be
Das Amt
Anderland
Der Androjäger
Angelo und Luzy
Angie (TV series)
Anja & Anton
Anke (TV series)
Anna (German TV series)
Anna Maria – Eine Frau geht ihren Weg
Anna und die Liebe
Die Anrheiner
Anwalt Abel
Die Anwälte
Archiv des Todes
Arme Millionäre
Arpad, der Zigeuner
Artzooka
Auf Achse (TV series)
Auf und davon – Mein Auslandstagebuch
Aus dem Tagebuch eines Minderjährigen
Aus heiterem Himmel
Auto Fritze
Die Autohändler
Avanti! Avanti!
Axel!
Axel! will’s wissen

B
Baldur Blauzahn
Balko
Die Bambus-Bären-Bande
Barfuß ins Bett
Ein Fall für B.A.R.Z.
Bas-Boris Bode
Der Bastian
Ein Bayer auf Rügen
Bei uns und um die Ecke
Bella Block
Bereitschaft Dr. Federau
Der Bergdoktor
Der Bergdoktor
Die Bergwacht
Berlin Bohème
Berlin, Berlin
Berliner Schnauzen
Berliner Weiße mit Schuß (TV series)
Bernds Hexe
Die Bertinis
Beschlossen und verkündet
Ein besonderes Paar
Das Beste aus meinem Leben
Die Besucher (TV series)
Bewegte Männer
Beutolomäus
Bianca – Wege zum Glück
Bibliothek der Sachgeschichten
Die Biene Maja (Anime)
Bilder, die die Welt bewegten
Bis in die Spitzen
Blam! (TV series)
Blankenese (TV series)
Blaubär und Blöd
Blaulicht (TV series)
Bloch (TV series)
Bolzplatz-Duell
Bon Courage
Böse Mädchen
Bronski und Bernstein
Broti & Pacek – Irgendwas ist immer
Der Bulle von Tölz
Büro, Büro
Butler Parker (TV series)

C
C’est ça, la vie
Café Meineid
Die Camper
Cartoon
Cartoon Network Beatbox
Chronik der Wende
Clara
Die Cleveren
Cliff Dexter
Der Clown
Club der roten Bänder
Cologne P.D.
Commissario Brunetti
Commissario Laurenti
Countdown – Die Jagd beginnt

D
Da kommt Kalle
Dahoam is Dahoam
Damals in der DDR
Danni Lowinski
Das kann ja heiter werden
Deadline – Jede Sekunde zählt
Dem Täter auf der Spur
Derrick
Derrick: Waldweg
Detektivbüro Roth
Deutsch Klasse
Diamantendetektiv Dick Donald
Der Dicke
Der Dicke und der Belgier
Didi – Der Untermieter
Die Didi-Show
Diese Drombuschs
Dimension PSI
Doctor Snuggles
Doctor’s Diary
Doktor Martin
Donky von Alpha 6*4
Donna Leon (TV series)
Donna Roma
Doppelter Einsatz
Dr. Molly & Karl
Dr. Sommerfeld – Neues vom Bülowbogen
Dr. Stefan Frank – Der Arzt, dem die Frauen vertrauen
Dr. Psycho – Die Bösen, die Bullen, meine Frau und ich
Drehkreuz Airport
Drei Damen vom Grill
Drei Dschungeldetektive
Drei reizende Schwestern
Die Dreisten Drei
Dresdner Schnauzen
Das Duo
Durch die Nacht mit …

E
Edel & Starck
Ehen vor Gericht
Ein ehrenwertes Haus
Eigener Herd ist Goldes wert
Eight Hours Don't Make a Day
Ein Fall für die Anrheiner
Ein Haus in der Toscana
Eine für alle – Frauen können’s besser
Eine wie keine
Einmal Prinz zu sein
Einzug ins Paradies
Eisbär, Affe & Co.
Eisenbahn-Romantik
El tonno
Elbflorenz (TV series)
Elefant, Tiger & Co.
Emm wie Meikel
Endlich Samstag!
Engel im Einsatz – mit Verona Pooth
Das Erbe der Guldenburgs
Der Ermittler
Der Eugen
Eurocops
Eurogang
Eva Blond
Eva – ganz mein Fall

F
Fabrixx
Der Fahnder
Ein Fall für Stein
Ein Fall für TKKG
Ein Fall für zwei
Der Fall von nebenan
Die Fallers – Eine Schwarzwaldfamilie
Familie Bergmann
Familie Dr. Kleist
Familie Heinz Becker
Familie Meier
Familie Neumann
Familie Schölermann
Familie Sonnenfeld
Die Familienanwältin
Englisch für Anfänger
Fast Track English
Fast wia im richtigen Leben

Felix (miniseries)
Die Fernfahrer
Feuerdrachen
Die Feuerengel
Das feuerrote Spielmobil

Die Firma Hesselbach
Fix und Foxi
Flash - Der Fotoreporter
Flax und Krümel
Flemming (TV series)
Der fließende Fels
Flitze Feuerzahn
Flugstaffel Meinecke
Der Forellenhof
Förster Horn
Forsthaus Falkenau
Frankensteins Tante (TV series)
Franzi (TV series)
Frauenarzt Dr. Markus Merthin
Freunde (TV series)
Freunde fürs Leben
Front ohne Gnade
Der Fuchs
Fünf auf dem Apfelstern
Fünf Freunde (1996)

Funkstreife Isar 12
Für alle Fälle Stefanie
Der Fürst und das Mädchen
Fußballtrainer Wulff
Die Fussbroichs

G
Les Gammas! Les Gammas!
Der ganz normale Wahnsinn
Gegen den Wind
Das Geheimnis der Sahara
Das Geheimnis des Sagala
Das Geheimnis meiner Familie
Das Geheimnis meines Vaters
Geheimprojekt Doombolt
Die Geissens – Eine schrecklich glamouröse Familie
Geld.Macht.Liebe
Geliebte Schwestern
Geschichten aus der Heimat
Geschichten übern Gartenzaun
Die Gespenster von Flatterfels
Gestatten, mein Name ist Cox
Gipfeltreffen
Giraffe, Erdmännchen & Co.
Girl friends – Freundschaft mit Herz
Gisbert (TV series)
Die glückliche Familie (TV series)
Gott sei dank … dass Sie da sind!
Graf Yoster gibt sich die Ehre
Die Grashüpfer (TV series)
Die Graslöwen
Die großen Kriminalfälle
Großstadtrevier
Großstadtträume
GSG 9 – Ihr Einsatz ist ihr Leben
Guten Morgen, Mallorca

H
Hablamos Español
Hafenpolizei
Hallo Robbie!
Hallo Spencer
Hallo Taxi (TV series)
Hallo, Onkel Doc!
Hals über Kopf
Hamburg Transit
Die Hammer-Soap – Heimwerker im Glück
Hand aufs Herz
Hanna – Folge deinem Herzen
Hans im Glück aus Herne 2
Happy Holiday
Das Haus der Krokodile
Das Haus mit der Nr. 30
Ein Haus voller Töchter
Der Hausgeist
Hausmeister Krause – Ordnung muss sein
Die Hausmeisterin
Der Havelkaiser
Headnut.tv
Heidi und Erni
Der Heiland auf dem Eiland
Ein Heim für Tiere
Helden der Kreisklasse
Helga und die Nordlichter
HeliCops – Einsatz über Berlin
Ein Herz und eine Seele
Herzflimmern – Die Klinik am See
Die Hesselbachs
Hessische Geschichten
Hexe Lilli (TV series)
Hilfe! Hochzeit! – Die schlimmste Woche meines Lebens
Hilfe, meine Familie spinnt
Hinter Gittern – Der Frauenknast
Hotel Elfie
Hotel Paradies
Hundkatzemaus
Hurra Deutschland
Die Hydronauten

I
Ich bin Boes
Ich heirate eine Familie
Ihr Auftrag, Pater Castell
Ijon Tichy: Raumpilot
Im Angesicht des Verbrechens
Im Namen des Gesetzes
Im Tal der wilden Rosen
Immenhof (TV series)
Immer wieder Sonntag
In aller Freundschaft
Insel der Träume (TV series)
Inspector Hornleigh Intervenes
Inspektor Rolle
I.O.B. Spezialauftrag
Irgendwie und Sowieso

J
Jabhook
Jack Holborn
Jakob und Adele
Janna (TV series)
Janoschs Traumstunde
Jasper, der Pinguin
Jede Menge Leben
JETS – Leben am Limit
Jim Knopf
Johanna (TV series)
 John Klings Abenteuer
Jokehnen
Jolly Joker
JoNaLu
Das Jugendgericht
Julia – Eine ungewöhnliche Frau
Julia – Wege zum Glück
Junger Herr auf altem Hof

K
K11 – Kommissare im Einsatz
K3 – Kripo Hamburg
Der Kaiser von Schexing
Kanzleramt (TV series)
Der Kapitän (TV series)
Käpt’n Blaubär Club
Kara Ben Nemsi Effendi
Die Karte mit dem Luchskopf
Das große Abenteuer des Kaspar Schmeck
Kater Mikesch
Katrin ist die Beste
Katrin und die Welt der Tiere
KDD – Kriminaldauerdienst
Kiezgeschichten
Die Kinder vom Alstertal
Kinder, Kinder
Kir Royal (TV series)
Eine Klasse für sich (TV series)
Der kleine Doktor
Der kleine Mann
Der kleine Mönch
Der kleine Ritter Trenk
Der kleine Vampir – Neue Abenteuer
Der kleine Vampir (1985)
Klemperer – Ein Leben in Deutschland
Kli-Kla-Klawitter
Klimawechsel
Klinik am Alex
Klinik unter Palmen
Klinikum Berlin Mitte – Leben in Bereitschaft
Knallerfrauen
Knallerkerle
Die Knapp-Familie
Die Komiker
Kommissar Beck – Die neuen Fälle
Kommissar Brahm
Kommissar Freytag
Kommissar LaBréa
Der Kommissar und das Meer
Der Kommissar
Kommissarin Lucas
Die Kommissarin
Der Komödienstadel
König von Kreuzberg
Der König
Königlich Bayerisches Amtsgericht
Korkmazlar
Körner und Köter
Kreuzfahrt ins Glück
KRIMI.DE
Der Kriminalist
Das Kriminalmuseum
Kripo live
Krügers Woche
KTI – Menschen lügen, Beweise nicht
Kümo Henriette
Der Kurier der Kaiserin
Die Küstenpiloten
Küstenwache (TV series)

L
Ladykracher
Ladyland
Der Landarzt
Landarzt Dr. Brock
Die Landärztin
Der lange Weg des Lukas B. (TV series)
Lasko – Die Faust Gottes
Laura und Luis
Lauras Stern
Le petit gnome
Leben für die Liebe (see also Tessa – Leben für die Liebe)
Der Lehrer
Leipzig Homicide
Lena – Liebe meines Lebens
Lenßen & Partner
Leopard, Seebär & Co.
Les années lycée
Der letzte Bulle
Der letzte Zeuge
Die Leute vom Domplatz
Leute wie du und ich
Lexx – The Dark Zone
Liebe, Babys und ein großes Herz
Die lieben Verwandten
Liebling Kreuzberg
Lilalu im Schepperland
Liste der Willkommen bei Mario Barth-Episoden
Little Amadeus
Lokaltermin (TV series)
Lotta in Love
Löwengrube (TV series)
Löwenzahn
Die Ludolfs – 4 Brüder auf'm Schrottplatz
Lukas (TV series)
Lukas und Sohn
Lutter (TV series)

M
Die Mädchen aus dem Weltraum
Maddin in Love
Mallorca – Suche nach dem Paradies
Mammutland
Mandara (TV series)
Ein Mann am Zug
Der Mann ohne Schatten
Die Männer vom K3
Manni, der Libero
Maple Avenue
Märchen der Völker
Märchen der Welt – Puppenspiel der kleinen Bühne
Marco – Über Meere und Berge
Mario (TV series)
Matt in 13 Zügen (TV series)
Max Wolkenstein
Medicopter 117 – Jedes Leben zählt
Mein Freund Winnetou
Mein Leben & Ich
Mein neuer Freund
Meine schönsten Jahre
Meine wunderbare Familie
Meister Eder und sein Pumuckl (TV series)
Melodien der Berge
Mensch Bachmann
Mensch Markus
Mensch, Pia!
Die merkwürdige Lebensgeschichte des Friedrich Freiherrn von der Trenck
Merlin (TV series)
M.E.T.R.O. – Ein Team auf Leben und Tod
Michel aus Lönneberga (TV series)
Der Millionenbauer
Der Millionenerbe
Mission Terra
Mit einem Bein im Grab
Mit Herz und Handschellen
Mit Karl May im Orient
Mit Leib und Seele
Mitten im Leben (comedy TV series)
Mitten im Leben (reality TV series)
Mitten in Europa – Deutsche Geschichte
Molle mit Korn
Momo
Monaco Franze – Der ewige Stenz
Mond Mond Mond
Die Montagsfamilie
Monty Python's Fliegender Zirkus
Mord in bester Gesellschaft
Mord mit Aussicht
Mordkommission Istanbul
Morgen schon
Moselbrück
Motiv Liebe
Motzki
MS Franziska
Mummy Nanny
München 7
Münchener Freiheit (TV series)

N
Naked & Funny
Nashorn, Zebra & Co.
Nesthäkchen (TV series)
Nesthocker – Familie zu verschenken
Die Neue – Eine Frau mit Kaliber
Neues aus Büttenwarder
Neues aus Uhlenbusch
Neues vom Süderhof
Nicht von dieser Welt (TV series)
Nicht von schlechten Eltern
Nick & Perry
Niedrig und Kuhnt – Kommissare ermitteln
NightWash
Nikola (TV series)
Ninas Welt
Nonni und Manni
Notarztwagen 7
Notruf Hafenkante
Nürnberger Schnauzen

O
Offroad.TV
Oh Gott, Herr Pfarrer
Oliver Maass
Olm unterwegs
OP ruft Dr. Bruckner
Ostsee-Schnauzen
Otto – Die Serie
Die Özdags

P
Pagten
Panda, Gorilla & Co.
Papageien, Palmen & Co.
Parkhotel Stern
Parole Chicago
Pastewka (TV series)
Patrik Pacard
Percy Stuart
Perfect Disaster
Peter ist der Boss
Peter Steiners Theaterstadl
Peter Strohm
Peter und Paul
Pfarrer Braun
Die Pfefferkörner
Der Pfundskerl
Pinguin, Löwe & Co.
Planète Némo
Playtime (Sprachkurs)
Plötzlich Papa – Einspruch abgelehnt!
Pogo 1104
Polizeifunk ruft
Polizeiinspektion 1
Polizeiruf 110
Post Mortem
Praktikanten - Jimi und Mitja machen den Jobcheck
Praxis Bülowbogen
Der Prins muß her
Der Prinz von Pumpelonien
PS (TV series)
Die Pulvermänner
Pumuckls Abenteuer

Q
Quentin Durward (TV series)

R
Ralphi – Der Schlaubär aus der Augsburger Puppenkiste
Rappelkiste
Das Rätsel der Sandbank
Raumpatrouille
Raumstation Unity
Ravioli (TV series)
Das Recht zu lieben
Regina auf den Stufen
Reläxx
Rentner haben niemals Zeit
Reporter (TV series)
Die Rettungsflieger
R. I. S. – Die Sprache der Toten
Ritas Welt
Rivalen der Rennbahn
Robbi, Tobbi und das Fliewatüüt
Ron und Tanja
Roncalli (TV series)
Rosa Roth
Die Rosen von Dublin
Die Rosenheim-Cops
Rote Bergsteiger (TV series)
Rote Erde (TV series)
Die rote Kapelle
Die Rote Meile
Rote Rosen
Die rote Zora und ihre Bande (TV series)
Die Rückkehr des Sandokan
Rußige Zeiten

S
Sabine (TV series)
Salto Kommunale
Salto Mortale (TV series)
Salto Postale
Samt und Seide
Unser Sandmännchen
Sandokan – Der Tiger von Malaysia
Sauerkraut (Helme Heine)
Der Schatz im All
Der Schatz im Niemandsland
Schicksale - und plötzlich ist alles anders
Ein Schloß am Wörthersee
Schloss Einstein
Schloß Hohenstein (TV series)
Schloß Pompon Rouge
Schlupp vom grünen Stern
Schmetterlinge im Bauch
Die schnelle Gerdi
Schuld nach Ferdinand von Schirach
Die Schule am See
Die Schule der kleinen Vampire
Schulmädchen
Der Schwammerlkönig
Schwarz greift ein
Schwarz Rot Gold
Die schwarzen Brüder
Die Schwarzwaldklinik
Die sechs Siebeng’scheiten
Sechserpack
Seehund, Puma & Co.
Die seltsamen Methoden des Franz Josef Wanninger
Sender Nordlicht
Die Sendung mit dem Elefanten
Die Sendung mit der Maus
Sergeant Berry (TV series)
Sesamstraße
Sie kommen aus Agarthi
Silas
Simsala Grimm
Sinan Toprak ist der Unbestechliche
Siska
Die Sitte
SK Kölsch
SK-Babies
Skippy der Buschpilot
DIE SNOBS - Sie können auch ohne Dich
So ist das Leben! Die Wagenfelds
SOKO 5113
SOKO Rhein-Main
SOKO Wismar
Solo für Sudmann
Sonderdezernat K1
Der Sonne entgegen
Sophie – Braut wider Willen
Der Spatz vom Wallrafplatz
Sperling (TV series)
Das Spielhaus (DDR)
Spreepiraten
Spuk am Tor der Zeit
Spuk aus der Gruft
Spuk im Reich der Schatten
St. Angela
Der Staatsanwalt hat das Wort
Staatsanwalt Posch ermittelt
Stadt, Land, Mord!
Stadtklinik
Stahlkammer Zürich
Stahlnetz
Starke Herzen
Ein starkes Team
Die Stein
Sterne des Südens
Sternenfänger
Sternensommer
Stolberg (TV series)
Die Strandclique
Die Straßen von Berlin
Stromberg
Stubbe – Von Fall zu Fall
Ein Stück Himmel
Stülpner-Legende
Sturm der Liebe
Stuttgart Homicide
Sylter Geschichten
Sylvia – Eine Klasse für sich

T
Tabaluga
Ein Tag schreibt Geschichte
Tagebuch einer Gänsemutter
Talk op Platt
Tanja (TV series)
Tanzalarm
Tapetenwechsel (TV series)
Tatort
Tatort Internet
Tegtmeier klärt auf!
Tegtmeiers Reisen
Telematch
Telerop 2009 – Es ist noch was zu retten
Terra X: Schliemanns Erben
Tessa – Leben für die Liebe (see also Leben für die Liebe'')
Teufels Großmutter
Tierarzt Dr. Engel
Tiere bis unters Dach
Tierisch Kölsch
Tierärztin Dr. Mertens
Till, der Junge von nebenan
Timm Thaler (1979 TV miniseries)
Timm Thaler (2002 TV series)
Tod eines Schülers
Der Tod ist kein Beinbruch
Tolle Trolle
Tom und das Erdbeermarmeladebrot mit Honig
Die Torpiraten
Total Genial
Total Normal
Transporter - Die Serie
Das Traumhotel
Das Traumschiff
Treffpunkt Flughafen
Paul Trimmel
Die Trotzkis
Türkisch für Anfänger
Twipsy
Two Funny
Typisch Sophie

U
Üb immer Treu nach Möglichkeit
Ulmens Auftrag
Um Himmels Willen
Und tschüss!
Unschuldig
Unser Charly
Unser Lehrer Doktor Specht
Unser Walter
Unsere Farm in Irland
Unsere schönsten Jahre
Das unsichtbare Visier
Unter den Linden – Das Haus Gravenhorst
Unter einem Dach
Unter einer Decke
Unter Verdacht (TV series)
Unter weißen Segeln
Unterwegs nach Atlantis (TV series)
Die Unverbesserlichen
USA & Canada - The freedom to be...

V
Vater Seidl und sein Sohn
Vater wider Willen
Die Verbrechen des Professor Capellari
Verliebt in Berlin
Verrückt nach Clara
Ein verrücktes Paar
Verschollen
Viens jouer avec nous
Die Viersteins
Vom Webstuhl zur Weltmacht
Von Null auf 42

W
Die Wache
Die Wächter
Wartesaal zum kleinen Glück
Was nicht passt, wird passend gemacht (TV series)
Wege zum Glück
Weissensee (TV series)
Weißblaue Geschichten
Westerdeich
Western von gestern
Die Wicherts von nebenan
Wie erziehe ich meine Eltern?
Wie gut, dass es Maria gibt
Wie schlau ist Deutschland?
Die Wiesingers
Wildbach (TV series)
Willkommen bei Mario Barth
Willi wills wissen
Wilsberg
Die Wilsheimer
WinneToons
Wir Deutschen
Wohnen nach Wunsch
Wolf, Bär & Co
Wolffs Revier

Z
Zack! Comedy nach Maß
Zahn um Zahn (TV series)
Zeit genug
Zentrale Bangkok
Zuhause im Glück – Unser Einzug in ein neues Leben
Zum Stanglwirt
Zur Freiheit
Zur See
Zwei am großen See
Zwei Ärzte sind einer zu viel
Zwei Brüder
Zwei himmlische Töchter
Zwei Münchner in Hamburg
Zwei Supertypen in Miami

External links
 German TV at the Internet Movie Database

Lists of television series by country of production
Series